Amiga Active was a monthly computer magazine published by Pinprint Publishing, it launched at a time when most other Amiga magazines had already closed, and as a result only had one major competitor: Amiga Format. A large proportion of the Amiga Active staff were from CU Amiga Magazine, which had closed the previous year. In total 26 issues were published, the first in October 1999, and the last in November 2001. The closure of Amiga Active ended the news-stand distribution of UK Amiga magazines after almost 14 years.

References

External links 

 Official Website
 Historical Information

Defunct computer magazines published in the United Kingdom
Amiga magazines
Magazines established in 1999
Magazines disestablished in 2001
Video game magazines published in the United Kingdom
1999 establishments in the United Kingdom